The Royal Netherlands Historical Society (or KNHG), founded 1845 under the name Historisch Gezelschap, is a historical society that also functions as a professional association of academic historians in the Netherlands. It represents the Netherlands in the International Committee of Historical Sciences.

The KNHG holds two annual conferences, one in the spring and one in the autumn, and publishes an open access journal, BMGN: Low Countries Historical Review.

Studies
 Leen Dorsman and Ed Jonker, Anderhalve eeuw geschiedenis: (Nederlands) Historisch Genootschap, 1845-1995 (The Hague, 1995).

References

External links
 
 

Historical societies of the Netherlands
Organizations established in 1845
1845 establishments in the Netherlands